Labat is a surname. Notable people with the surname include:

Florencia Labat (born 1971),  Argentinian professional female tennis player
Jean-Baptiste Labat (1663–1738), French clergyman, botanist, writer, explorer, ethnographer & soldier
René Labat (born 1892), French athlete